Norton Water Tower is a water tower in Norton, Runcorn, Cheshire, England.  It is recorded in the National Heritage List for England as a designated Grade II listed building.

History
It was built between 1888 and 1892 on the water pipeline between Lake Vyrnwy in North Wales and Liverpool to act as a balancing reservoir in the process of supplying water to Runcorn and Liverpool. It is the largest UK tromboned pressure relief device currently in operation. The tower was designed by George F. Deacon, the Chief Engineer of the Liverpool Corporation Waterworks Department.

Description
On its top is a cast iron tank with a capacity of 650,000 gallons. Ten pilasters rise from a rock-faced base and between them are round-headed arches. Above these is a frieze with a Latin inscription and over this is a cornice. On the top is the iron tank with a decorated exterior. Translated, the inscription on the frieze reads: This water, derived from the sources of the Severn, is brought to the City of Liverpool, a distance of eighty miles, through the mountains and over the plains of Wales and the intervening country, at the cost of the municipality, in the year of Our Lord 1892.

See also

Listed buildings in Runcorn (urban area)

References

Towers completed in 1892
Grade II listed buildings in Cheshire
Water towers in the United Kingdom
Buildings and structures in Runcorn
Infrastructure completed in 1892
Towers in Cheshire